Bolero, Sarajevo or shortened Bolero is the name of a theatre show produced by the East West Theatre Company from Bosnia and Herzegovina and Tala Dance Center  from Croatia. Authors, choreographer Tamara Curic from Zagreb, Croatia and director Haris Pasovic, created a dance performance in which Sarajevo and choreography impressed with Maurice Béjart's work  are in interaction. They were largely inspired by the flux of Sarajevo, Ravel's music and 'Béjartesque' swinging bodies. Performance included dancers from Zagreb who regularly collaborate  with the TALA Dance Centre, actors of the East West Theatre Company from Sarajevo, and the members of the Sarajevo National Theatre's Ballet Company.

Haris Pasovic, Sarajevo theater director and drama professor at the Academy of Performing Arts, injected this predominantly dance production with occasional humorous monologues, in which the people of Sarajevo tell intimate stories about their post-war lives. This performance was created to commemorate the siege of Sarajevo during the Bosnian War.

Bolero, Sarajevo opened international gathering of choreographers, dance artists and groups "Platforma" in Zagreb in 2008. During this occasion, the show was performed on the stage of festival partner, Zagreb Youth Theatre and received predominately positive critiques in a number of major Croatian newspapers. Bosnian premiere was held  April 6, 2008 in Sarajevo - on the anniversary of the siege of Sarajevo.

The original cast of “Bolero, Sarajevo” consists of the following soloists: Ognjen Vucinic, Ivana Miletic, Mihael Mateescu, Lidija Stevanovic, Amar Selimovic, Maja Izetbegovic, Irma Alimanovic, Nusmir Muharemovic, Maja Zeco, Nevena Rosuljas, Emir Fejzic, Edis Zilic, Sabina Sokolović, Danijela Bibic, Dina Ekstajn, Zvonka Skrabin Domacinovic, Zvonimir Kvesic, Tomislav Pesut, Mark Boldin, Jovana Milosavljevic, Aleksandra Smiljanic, Evgenij Gaponjko, and Bojan Valentic.

References

Theatre in Bosnia and Herzegovina
Culture in Sarajevo